Minnie Lake Township is a civil township in Barnes County, North Dakota, United States. As of the 2000 census, its population was 63.

Demography 
According to the 2010 census, there were 50 people residing in Minnie Lake Township. Of the 50 residents, 98% were White, 2% other race.

References

Townships in Barnes County, North Dakota
Townships in North Dakota